Peter Keller (died 2012) was an American survivalist and murderer who admitted to killing his wife and daughter in a video diary. He killed himself while evading capture in a bunker he built in Rattlesnake Ridge in King County, Washington.

References

2012 deaths
Murder–suicides in Washington (state)
Survivalists
Year of birth missing
Crimes in Washington (state)
Familicides